Ahmadiyya in Pakistan are members of the Ahmadiyya Muslim Community. The number of Ahmadiyya in the country has been variously estimated to between 0.22% and 2.2% of Pakistan's population. Hence, Pakistan is the home to the largest population of Ahmadis in the world. The city of Rabwah in the province of Punjab used to be the global headquarters of the Ahmadiyya Community before they were moved to England. 

Ahmadis in Pakistan have often come under religious persecution and discrimination. According to a Pew Research Center, only 7% of Pakistanis consider Ahmadis as Muslims. 

The Ahmadiyya movement originated in the city of Qadian. Following the independence of Pakistan, Ahmadis moved to the city of Rabwah to establish their headquarters. There have been a number of notable Pakistani people who have belonged to the Ahmadiyya Community, including the country's first Nobel Prize laureate, Abdus Salam and Pakistan's first foreign minister Muhammad Zafarullah Khan. Ahmadiyya and Mahdavia constitute the two main Mahdi'ist creeds in Pakistan.

History

Pre-independence era

Supporters of Pakistani movement

Movement for returning of Jinnah 

Mirza Basheer-ud-Din Mahmood Ahmad, the second spiritual leader of the community, ordered the cleric of Ahmadiyya  Community in England named Maulana Abdul Raheem Dard, to talk with Jinnah. He met Jinnah in King's Bench Walk, London and they spoke for three hours. Jinnah agreed to it and returned to India.

Support in AIML in 1946 elections of India 
Muhammad Zafarullah Khan, drafted Pakistan Resolution, Ahmad advised the Ahmadis to support All India Muslim League in the elections of 1945–6. Khan also gave a speech in London for the freedom of India.

Resignation of Khizar Hayat Tiwanna 

Khizar Hayat headed the local government in Punjab in 1946, supported by Congress and Akali Dal. Muslim League opposed his government. Due to the boycotts engulfing the Punjab, he resigned as Premier on 2 March 1947. Later, he moved to Pakistan for a few years and then to California, where he died.

Struggle for Muslim Rights in Boundary Commission

After the creation of Pakistan and creation of Rabwah 

After the creation of Pakistan, some Ahmadis with the Mirza Basheer-ud-Din Mahmood Ahmad came to Pakistan and constructed their own city which they considered a promised land.

1953 Anti-Ahmadiyya riots 

A massive persecution was launched by anti-Ahmadiyya groups to persecute the Ahmadiyya Muslim Community by Islamists including Jamaat-e-Islami. The Government of Pakistan put down the unrest. The Ahrar sect was banned shortly after.

1974 Anti-Ahmadiyya riots and Second Amendment to the Constitution of Pakistan 

Amidst more massive persecution and the appearance of an Anti-Ahmadiyya movement called Tehreek-e-Khatme Nabuwwat, Pasban Khatme Nabuwwat launched by all Islamist parties. They forced the Government of Pakistan under Zulfiqar Ali Bhutto to pass a constitutionally Second Amendment to the Constitution of Pakistan for declaring members of Ahmadiyya Muslim Community as non-Muslims.

1984 Anti-Ahmadiyya Amendment 

Under president Zia-ul-Haq, an anti-Ahmadiyya ordinance was made in the Constitution of Pakistan which restricted the freedom of religion for Ahmadis. According to this law, Ahmadis cannot call themselves Muslim or "pose as Muslims" which is punishable by three years in prison.

Headquarters shifted to London 
Following the enactment of these two amendments, which legalized persecution of Ahmadis, Mirza Tahir Ahmad, the caliph of the community, shifted the central headquarters to London in 1985.

Community issues

Persecution and anti-Ahmadiyya sentiment

Qadiani and Mirzai are the derogatory terms used for Ahmadis. Anti-Ahmadiyya groups have called for an Islamist jihad to finish off the community. In 2018, Azad Jammu and Kashmir parliament unanimously declares Ahmadis as non-Muslims.

Pakistanis usually label Ahmadis as Qadianis, which is a derogative term to the community. Pakistan's Second Amendment to the Constitution officially declared Ahmadis to be non-Muslims.

See also

 Minorities in Pakistan
 Islam in Pakistan

References

 
Persecution by Muslims